Besalampy is a district in western Madagascar. It is a part of Melaky Region and borders the districts of Soalala in northeast, Kandreho in east, Ambatomainty in southeast, Morafenobe in south and Maintirano in southwest.

Municipalities
The district is further divided into nine municipalities:
 
 Ambolodia Sud
 Ampako
 Ankasakasa Tsibiray
 Antsirasira
 Bekodoka
 Besalampy
 Mahabe
 Marovoay Sud
 Soanenga

Rivers
 The Maningoza river

Protected areas 
 Bemarivo Reserve at 12 km from Besalampy.
 The Maningoza Reserve is located in the district of Besalampy.

Access 
By road: from Antananarivo - Tsiroanomandidy -Besalampy by the route nationale n°1

References and notes

Districts of Melaky